Overturn Glacier is a short tributary glacier of the Hatherton Glacier 3.6 nautical miles (7 km) west of Junction Spur in Darwin Mountains of Antarctica. The glacier is steep without crevasses. Named by the members of a New Zealand Antarctic Research Program (NZARP) field group who had a dramatic overturn with their toboggan while driving down the glacier.

Glaciers of Oates Land